This list contains the year and name of Past Grand Worthy Presidents for the Fraternal Order of Eagles

Past Grand Worthy Presidents

 1898 — John Cort
 1899 — John W. Considine
 1900 — H. R. Littlefield 
 1901 — Del Cary Smith 
 1902 — Del Cary Smith 
 1903 — Timothy D. Sullivan 
 1904 — John F. Pelletier 
 1905 — Hy D. Davis 
 1906 — E. W. Krause 
 1907 — Theo A. Bell 
 1908 — B.J. Monaghan
 1909 — Frank E. Hering 
 1910 — Thomas F. Grady 
 1911 — Frank E. Hering 
 1912 — William J. Brennan 
 1913 — Thomas J. Cogan 
 1914 — Conrad H. Mann 
 1915 — William L. Grayson 
 1916 — Rex B. Goodcell 
 1917 — Carl G. Winter 
 1918 — A. B. Duncan
 1919 — Elbert D. Weed
 1920 — Elbert D. Weed
 1921 — John M. Morin
 1922 — Herbert I. Choynski
 1923 — Howard N. Ragland
 1924 — Otto P. Deluse
 1925 — Charles C. Guenther
 1926 — Michael O. Burns
 1927 — L.V. Westerman
 1928 — Edward J. Ryan
 1929 — Charles J. Chenu
 1930 — Robert E. Proctor
 1931 — J.C. Canty
 1932 — Henry J. Berrodin
 1933 — George Nordin
 1934 — George F. Douglas
 1935 — George Nordin
 1936 — Dr. H. B. Mehrmann
 1937 — John W. Heller Jr.
 1938 — Dr. Fred C. Dilley
 1939 — John A. Abel
 1940 — Charles P. McCann
 1941 — George C. Tank
 1942 — Lester H. Loble
 1943 — Robert W. Hansen
 1944 — John W. Young
 1945 — Edward F. Poss
 1946 — James W. Bryan
 1947 — Raymond P. McElroy
 1947 — E. J. Balsiger
 1948 — DeVere Watson
 1949 — William H. Mostyn
 1949 — G. A. Farabaugh 
 1949 — Barnett H. Goldstein 
 1950 — William Hornblower
 1951 — William P. Wetherald
 1952 — Ray A. Rhode
 1953 — Robert W. Hansen
 1954 — Carl McGriff
 1954 — James Cheetham 
 1954 — Walter J. S. Laurie 
 1954 — John J. Rice  
 1955 — Maurice Splain Jr. 
 1956 — Lawrence Leahy
 1957 — Martin Mol
 1958 — Andrew J. Halloran
 1959 — J. Philip Bigley
 1960 — Leo V. Connell
 1961 — Paul N. Hoffman
 1962 — Carl Thacker
 1963 — Herschel McWilliams
 1964 — Harry E. Burns
 1965 — Max F. Schroeder Jr.
 1966 — D.D. Billings
 1967 — William A. McCawley
 1968 — Harry B. A. Ford
 1969 — Steven V. Thomas Jr.
 1970 — Maynard Floyd
 1971 — Ken Stewardson
 1972 — J. C. Mitchell 
 1973 — James J. Bailey
 1974 — Lewis Reed
 1975 — Joseph E. Fournier
 1975 — Arthur S. Ehrmann  
 1976 — Clyde J. Schmieg
 1976 — Michael T. Gaffney  
 1976 — Al T. Williams  
 1977 — Anthony Angelo
 1978 — D. D. "Doc" Dunlap
 1979 — Leo Lentsch
 1980 — Kenneth Amsbaugh
 1980 — Paul E. Eichman  
 1981 — James I. Mason
 1982 — Ben E. Packard 
 1983 — Peter "Pio" Scagnelli
 1984 — Russell E. Clark
 1985 — B. J. Sims 
 1986 — Jerry W. Wilson
 1987 — Vincent Cherry
 1988 — Laverne T. Weber
 1989 — Dale E. Webster
 1990 — Ken Cross
 1991 — John Lester
 1992 — Sherm Spears
 1993 — Henry M. Funk
 1994 — E. L. "Bud" Collett
 1995 — George F. Ziebol
 1996 — D. R. "Jim" West 
 1997 — William "Bill" Blum 
 1998 — Andrew Vollmer  
 1999 — Larry Hanshaw 
 2000 — W. P. "Pete" Harty
 2001 — Edgar L. "Ed" Bollenbacher
 2002 — Fred E. Smith
 2003 — Wayne D. Clark
 2004 — Orville "Sonny" Crawford 
 2005 — Chris Lainas Jr.
 2006 — William L. "Bill" Loffer   
 2006 — Robert "Bob" Wahls 
 2007 — John Potter 
 2008 — James H. "Jim" Roberts
 2009 — Michael B. "Mike" Lagervall
 2010 — Phillip D. "Phil" Tice 
 2011 — Melvin Fry
 2012 — Ron Stine
 2013 — David Tice
 2014 — Elwin "Bud" Haigh
 2015 — Charles "Chuck" Lang 
 2016 — Jerry L. Sullivan
 2017 — Thomas L. “Tom” McGrath

See also
 List of Past Grand Madam Presidents

Notes

References
 

Fraternal Order of Eagles
Lists of American people